Filip Viktor Helander (born 22 April 1993) is a Swedish professional footballer who plays as a centre-back for Scottish Premiership side Rangers and the Sweden national team.

Club career

Malmö
Helander made his Allsvenskan debut in a match against Syrianska on 17 October 2011. Helander played the first matches beside Pontus Jansson in defence before being replaced by Daniel Andersson after the second round of matches. On 17 July 2012, Helander signed a first team contract with Malmö until the end of the 2015 season. When Andersson played less and less after the summer break Helander established himself in the starting lineup and finished the season as a regular starter in the defence. Helander played a total of 12 league matches for Malmö during the 2012 season.

The league title winning 2013 season proved to be the real breakthrough season for Helander as he played 18 matches for the club. He was injured in the early stages of the season and was replaced in the starting line-up by Erik Johansson but later reclaimed this spot in the second part of the season. For the 2014 season Helander played regularly throughout the entire season as the club defended their league title and qualified for the group stage of the 2014–15 UEFA Champions League. He also scored his first league goal for Malmö in 2014 on 23 August in a 3–0 home win against IFK Norrköping. For his performances in the league Helander was nominated for the award of Allsvenskan defender of the year. He was also nominated for Swedish defender of the year at Fotbollsgalan.

Hellas Verona
On 22 July 2015, Helander signed for Hellas Verona in the Italian Serie A. On 23 September, he made his debut against Internazionale in a 1–0 defeat at the San Siro. In the next game against Lazio at home he again was in the starting line up and in the 33rd minute he scored his first Serie A goal. Lazio went on to win the game 2–1.

Bologna
On 31 August 2016, Helander joined Bologna on a season-long loan deal, with an obligation to sign outright at the end of season. As part of the deal, Nicolò Cherubin moved to Verona. On 12 June 2017, Helander joined Bologna on a definitive basis.

The following season, his second with the Rossoblù, Helander found more space in the rotation under coach Roberto Donadoni, playing 29 games. His club season ended early in April 2018 because of an injury, but without risking the World Cup in which he participated as a reserve.

Rangers
Helander was announced as a new signing for Rangers in the Scottish Premiership on 13 July 2019. Helander's cost was £3.5 million. He made his debut in a Scottish League Cup tie against East Fife, scoring a goal as Rangers came out 3–0 victors.

On 11 March 2021, Helander scored the equaliser for Rangers in a 1–1 draw away to Slavia Prague in their Europa League Round of 16 first leg match.

On 29 August 2021, Helander scored the only goal of the game for Rangers against Celtic in the first Old Firm derby of the 2021–22 season. On 15 September 2021, Rangers manager Steven Gerrard announced that Helander would be out for the foreseeable future after having undergone surgery on a knee injury sustained in a 2–1 win over St Johnstone four days prior.

International career
Helander was called up to the senior Sweden squad to face Moldova in October 2015.

He was part of Sweden's squad for the 2018 FIFA World Cup in Russia.

In May 2021, he was named in Sweden's squad for the postponed UEFA Euro 2020 tournament.

Career statistics

Club

International

Honours
Malmö FF
 Allsvenskan: 2013, 2014
 Svenska Supercupen: 2014

Rangers
Scottish Premiership: 2020–21
Scottish Cup: 2021–22
Scottish League Cup runner-up: 2019–20

Sweden U21
 UEFA European Under-21 Championship: 2015

Individual
 UEFA European Under-21 Championship – Team of the Tournament: 2015

References

External links

Living people
1993 births
Footballers from Malmö
Swedish footballers
Footballers from Skåne County
Association football defenders
Sweden international footballers
Sweden under-21 international footballers
Sweden youth international footballers
2018 FIFA World Cup players
UEFA Euro 2020 players
Allsvenskan players
Serie A players
Kvarnby IK players
Malmö FF players
Hellas Verona F.C. players
Bologna F.C. 1909 players
Rangers F.C. players
Scottish Professional Football League players
Swedish expatriate footballers
Swedish expatriate sportspeople in Italy
Expatriate footballers in Italy
Swedish expatriate sportspeople in Scotland
Expatriate footballers in Scotland